The following tables list films released in 2013. Three popular films (Top Gun, Jurassic Park, and The Wizard of Oz) were re-released in 3D and IMAX.

Evaluation of the year
Richard Brody of The New Yorker said, "The year 2013 has been an amazing one for movies, though maybe every year is an amazing year for movies if one is ready to be amazed by movies. It’s also a particularly apt year to make a list of the best films. Making a list is not merely a numerical act but also a polemical one, and the best of this year’s films are polemical in their assertion of the singularity of cinema, as well as of the art form’s opposition to the disposable images of television. The 2013 crop comprises an unplanned, if not accidental, collective declaration of the essence of the cinema, an art of images and sounds that, at their best, don’t exist to tell a story or to tantalize the audience (though they may well do so) but, rather, to reflect a crisis in the life of the filmmaker and the state of the artist’s mind or, even, soul." He also stated, "The best movies this year are films of combative cinema, audacious inventions in vision. The specificity and originality of their moment-to-moment creation of images offers new ways for viewers to confront the notion of what “narrative” might be. Their revitalization of storytelling as experience restores to the cinema its primordial mode of redefining consciousness. It’s significant that some of the filmmakers in the forefront of that charge are from the generation of the elders, innovators of the seventies. In the age of radical cinema sparked by digital technology, the rise of independent producers, and the ready ubiquity of the history of cinema (thanks to DVDs and streaming video), these older directors have experienced a glorious second youth. That artistic rejuvenation is also due to the stimulating ambiance of actual youth—a young generation of freethinking cinephiles, critics, and filmmakers who, thanks to the Internet, make their appreciation of these sublime extremes widely and quickly known, even when the mainstream of viewers and reviewers miss out."

Highest-grossing films

The top 10 films released in 2013 by worldwide gross are as follows:

Box office records
Frozen and Iron Man 3 both grossed over $1.2 billion, making them among the 51 highest-grossing films of all time. 
Frozen became the second animated film after Toy Story 3 (2010) to gross $1 billion, and became the highest-grossing animated film at release.
Iron Man 3 became the second film in the Marvel Cinematic Universe to gross over $1 billion, after The Avengers.
After being re-released in 3-D, Jurassic Park surpassed the $1 billion mark, and is the 41st highest-grossing film of all time.

Events
 2nd AACTA International Awards
 18th Critics' Choice Awards
 19th Screen Actors Guild Awards
 28th Independent Spirit Awards
 33rd Golden Raspberry Awards
 39th Saturn Awards
 61st FAMAS Awards
 63rd Berlin International Film Festival
 66th British Academy Film Awards
 70th Golden Globe Awards
 70th Venice International Film Festival
 85th Academy Awards
 2013 Cannes Film Festival
 2013 MTV Movie Awards
 2013 Sundance Film Festival
 2013 Toronto International Film Festival

Awards

2013 films 
The list of films released in 2013, arranged by country, are as follows:
 List of American films of 2013
 List of Argentine films of 2013
 List of Australian films of 2013
 List of Brazilian films of 2013
 List of British films of 2013
 List of French films of 2013
 List of Hong Kong films of 2013
 List of Italian films of 2013
 List of Indian films of 2013
 List of Assamese films
 List of Bengali films of 2013
 List of Bollywood films of 2013
 List of Gujarati films
 List of Kannada films of 2013
 List of Malayalam films of 2013
 List of Marathi films of 2013
 List of Odia films of 2013
 List of Punjabi films of 2013
 List of Tamil films of 2013
 List of Telugu films of 2013
 List of Tulu films
 List of Japanese films of 2013
 List of Mexican films of 2013
 List of Pakistani films of 2013
 List of Russian films of 2013
 List of South Korean films of 2013
 List of Spanish films of 2013

Deaths

References

 
Film by year